Tragocephala descarpentriesi is a species of beetle in the family Cerambycidae. It was described by Lepesme and Stephan von Breuning in 1950.

References

descarpentriesi
Beetles described in 1950